Yenice, also Çeltik, is a town and district of Karabük Province in the Black Sea region of Turkey. According to the 2000 census, population of the district is 26,951 of which 11,228 live in the town of Yenice.

Notes

References

External links

 District governor's official website 

Populated places in Karabük Province
Districts of Karabük Province